Vladimirovka is the name of a number of  rural localities in Russia.

Modern localities

Altai Krai
As of 2010, one rural locality in Altai Krai bears this name:
Vladimirovka, Altai Krai, a selo under the administrative jurisdiction of the town of krai significance of Slavgorod

Altai Republic
As of 2010, one rural locality in the Altai Republic bears this name:
Vladimirovka, Altai Republic, a selo in Korgonskoye Rural Settlement of Ust-Kansky District

Amur Oblast
As of 2010, one rural locality in Amur Oblast bears this name:
Vladimirovka, Amur Oblast, a selo in Ust-Ivanovsky Rural Settlement of Blagoveshchensky District

Astrakhan Oblast
As of 2010, one rural locality in Astrakhan Oblast bears this name:
Vladimirovka, Astrakhan Oblast, a selo in Vladimirovsky Selsoviet of Yenotayevsky District

Republic of Bashkortostan
As of 2010, four rural localities in the Republic of Bashkortostan bear this name:
Vladimirovka, Blagoveshchensky District, Republic of Bashkortostan, a village in Staronadezhdinsky Selsoviet of Blagoveshchensky District
Vladimirovka, Buzdyaksky District, Republic of Bashkortostan, a village in Gafuriysky Selsoviet of Buzdyaksky District
Vladimirovka, Sharansky District, Republic of Bashkortostan, a village in Pisarevsky Selsoviet of Sharansky District
Vladimirovka, Sterlitamaksky District, Republic of Bashkortostan, a village in Pervomaysky Selsoviet of Sterlitamaksky District

Belgorod Oblast
As of 2010, three rural localities in Belgorod Oblast bear this name:
Vladimirovka, Ivnyansky District, Belgorod Oblast, a selo in Ivnyansky District
Vladimirovka, Starooskolsky District, Belgorod Oblast, a selo in Starooskolsky District
Vladimirovka, Volokonovsky District, Belgorod Oblast, a khutor in Golofeyevsky Rural Okrug of Volokonovsky District

Bryansk Oblast
As of 2010, five rural localities in Bryansk Oblast bear this name:
Vladimirovka, Gordeyevsky District, Bryansk Oblast, a settlement in Smyalchsky Selsoviet of Gordeyevsky District
Vladimirovka, Komarichsky District, Bryansk Oblast, a settlement in Khlebtovsky Selsoviet of Komarichsky District
Vladimirovka, Mglinsky District, Bryansk Oblast, a settlement in Velzhichsky Selsoviet of Mglinsky District
Vladimirovka, Rognedinsky District, Bryansk Oblast, a village in Vladimirovsky Selsoviet of Rognedinsky District
Vladimirovka, Surazhsky District, Bryansk Oblast, a settlement in Vyukovsky Selsoviet of Surazhsky District

Chelyabinsk Oblast
As of 2010, one rural locality in Chelyabinsk Oblast bears this name:
Vladimirovka, Chelyabinsk Oblast, a selo in Kulevchinsky Selsoviet of Varnensky District

Irkutsk Oblast
As of 2010, one rural locality in Irkutsk Oblast bears this name:
Vladimirovka, Irkutsk Oblast, a village in Tulunsky District

Jewish Autonomous Oblast
As of 2010, one rural locality in the Jewish Autonomous Oblast bears this name:
Vladimirovka, Jewish Autonomous Oblast, a selo in Smidovichsky District

Kaliningrad Oblast
As of 2010, one rural locality in Kaliningrad Oblast bears this name:
Vladimirovka, Kaliningrad Oblast, a settlement in Kutuzovsky Rural Okrug of Guryevsky District

Khabarovsk Krai
As of 2010, two rural localities in Khabarovsk Krai bear this name:
Vladimirovka, imeni Lazo District, Khabarovsk Krai, a selo in imeni Lazo District
Vladimirovka, imeni Poliny Osipenko District, Khabarovsk Krai, a selo in imeni Poliny Osipenko District

Krasnodar Krai
As of 2010, one rural locality in Krasnodar Krai bears this name:
Vladimirovka, Krasnodar Krai, a selo under the administrative jurisdiction of Primorsky City District of the City of Novorossiysk

Krasnoyarsk Krai
As of 2010, two rural localities in Krasnoyarsk Krai bear this name:
Vladimirovka, Bogotolsky District, Krasnoyarsk Krai, a village in Bogotolsky Selsoviet of Bogotolsky District
Vladimirovka, Nazarovsky District, Krasnoyarsk Krai, a village in Krasnopolyansky Selsoviet of Nazarovsky District

Kursk Oblast
As of 2010, two rural localities in Kursk Oblast bear this name:
Vladimirovka, Kastorensky District, Kursk Oblast, a selo in Orekhovsky Selsoviet of Kastorensky District
Vladimirovka, Pristensky District, Kursk Oblast, a village in Verkhneploskovsky Selsoviet of Pristensky District

Leningrad Oblast
As of 2010, three rural localities in Leningrad Oblast bear this name:
Vladimirovka, Lomonosovsky District, Leningrad Oblast, a village in Nizinskoye Settlement Municipal Formation of Lomonosovsky District
Vladimirovka, Priozersky District, Leningrad Oblast, a logging depot settlement in Gromovskoye Settlement Municipal Formation of Priozersky District
Vladimirovka, Vyborgsky District, Leningrad Oblast, a logging depot settlement in Polyanskoye Settlement Municipal Formation of Vyborgsky District

Lipetsk Oblast
As of 2010, one rural locality in Lipetsk Oblast bears this name:
Vladimirovka, Lipetsk Oblast, a village in Timiryazevsky Selsoviet of Zadonsky District

Republic of Mordovia
As of 2010, one rural locality in the Republic of Mordovia bears this name:
Vladimirovka, Republic of Mordovia, a selo in Aleksandrovsky Selsoviet of Lyambirsky District

Moscow Oblast
As of 2010, three rural localities in Moscow Oblast bear this name:
Vladimirovka, Klinsky District, Moscow Oblast, a village in Vozdvizhenskoye Rural Settlement of Klinsky District
Vladimirovka, Lotoshinsky District, Moscow Oblast, a village in Mikulinskoye Rural Settlement of Lotoshinsky District
Vladimirovka, Ramensky District, Moscow Oblast, a village in Rybolovskoye Rural Settlement of Ramensky District

Nizhny Novgorod Oblast
As of 2013, five rural localities in Nizhny Novgorod Oblast bear this name:
Vladimirovka, Diveyevsky District, Nizhny Novgorod Oblast, a village in Diveyevsky Selsoviet of Diveyevsky District
Vladimirovka, Kstovsky District, Nizhny Novgorod Oblast, a village in Chernukhinsky Selsoviet of Kstovsky District
Vladimirovka, Lukoyanovsky District, Nizhny Novgorod Oblast, a village in Lopatinsky Selsoviet of Lukoyanovsky District
Vladimirovka, Lyskovsky District, Nizhny Novgorod Oblast, a village in Berendeyevsky Selsoviet of Lyskovsky District
Vladimirovka, Pilninsky District, Nizhny Novgorod Oblast, a village in Bolsheandosovsky Selsoviet of Pilninsky District

Novgorod Oblast
As of 2010, one rural locality in Novgorod Oblast bears this name:
Vladimirovka, Novgorod Oblast, a village in Gorskoye Settlement of Soletsky District

Novosibirsk Oblast
As of 2010, two rural localities in Novosibirsk Oblast bear this name:
Vladimirovka, Bagansky District, Novosibirsk Oblast, a selo in Bagansky District
Vladimirovka, Toguchinsky District, Novosibirsk Oblast, a selo in Toguchinsky District

Omsk Oblast
As of 2010, two rural localities in Omsk Oblast bear this name:
Vladimirovka, Kolosovsky District, Omsk Oblast, a village in Lamanovsky Rural Okrug of Kolosovsky District
Vladimirovka, Lyubinsky District, Omsk Oblast, a village in Veselopolyansky Rural Okrug of Lyubinsky District

Orenburg Oblast
As of 2010, three rural localities in Orenburg Oblast bear this name:
Vladimirovka, Krasnogvardeysky District, Orenburg Oblast, a selo in Zalesovsky Selsoviet of Krasnogvardeysky District
Vladimirovka, Ponomaryovsky District, Orenburg Oblast, a settlement in Nizhnekuzlinsky Selsoviet of Ponomaryovsky District
Vladimirovka, Tyulgansky District, Orenburg Oblast, a selo in Chapayevsky Selsoviet of Tyulgansky District

Primorsky Krai
As of 2010, two rural localities in Primorsky Krai bear this name:
Vladimirovka, Kirovsky District, Primorsky Krai, a selo in Kirovsky District
Vladimirovka, Oktyabrsky District, Primorsky Krai, a selo in Oktyabrsky District

Ryazan Oblast
As of 2010, two rural localities in Ryazan Oblast bear this name:
Vladimirovka, Korablinsky District, Ryazan Oblast, a village in Amanovsky Rural Okrug of Korablinsky District
Vladimirovka, Alexandro-Nevsky District, Ryazan Oblast, a village in Blagovsky Rural Okrug of Alexandro-Nevsky District

Sakha Republic
As of 2010, one rural locality in the Sakha Republic bears this name:
Vladimirovka, Sakha Republic, a selo in Khatassky Rural Okrug of Yakutsk

Sakhalin Oblast
As of 2010, one rural locality in Sakhalin Oblast bears this name:
Vladimirovka, Sakhalin Oblast, a selo in Alexandrovsk-Sakhalinsky District

Samara Oblast
As of 2010, five rural localities in Samara Oblast bear this name:
Vladimirovka, Bezenchuksky District, Samara Oblast, a selo in Bezenchuksky District
Vladimirovka, Isaklinsky District, Samara Oblast, a village in Isaklinsky District
Vladimirovka, Khvorostyansky District, Samara Oblast, a selo in Khvorostyansky District
Vladimirovka, Klyavlinsky District, Samara Oblast, a village in Klyavlinsky District
Vladimirovka, Yelkhovsky District, Samara Oblast, a village in Yelkhovsky District

Saratov Oblast
As of 2010, four rural localities in Saratov Oblast bear this name:
Vladimirovka, Krasnokutsky District, Saratov Oblast, a selo in Krasnokutsky District
Vladimirovka, Novouzensky District, Saratov Oblast, a khutor in Novouzensky District
Vladimirovka, Pugachyovsky District, Saratov Oblast, a selo in Pugachyovsky District
Vladimirovka, Yekaterinovsky District, Saratov Oblast, a village in Yekaterinovsky District

Smolensk Oblast
As of 2010, two rural localities in Smolensk Oblast bear this name:
Vladimirovka, Khislavichsky District, Smolensk Oblast, a village in Vladimirovskoye Rural Settlement of Khislavichsky District
Vladimirovka, Pochinkovsky District, Smolensk Oblast, a village in Lysovskoye Rural Settlement of Pochinkovsky District

Stavropol Krai
As of 2010, two rural localities in Stavropol Krai bear this name:
Vladimirovka, Levokumsky District, Stavropol Krai, a selo in Vladimirovsky Selsoviet of Levokumsky District
Vladimirovka, Turkmensky District, Stavropol Krai, a settlement in Vladimirovsky Selsoviet of Turkmensky District

Sverdlovsk Oblast
As of 2010, one rural locality in Sverdlovsk Oblast bears this name:
Vladimirovka, Sverdlovsk Oblast, a village in Tavdinsky District

Tambov Oblast
As of 2010, one rural locality in Tambov Oblast bears this name:
Vladimirovka, Tambov Oblast, a village in Troitsky Selsoviet of Muchkapsky District

Republic of Tatarstan
As of 2010, three rural localities in the Republic of Tatarstan bear this name:
Vladimirovka, Aksubayevsky District, Republic of Tatarstan, a village in Aksubayevsky District
Vladimirovka, Almetyevsky District, Republic of Tatarstan, a village in Almetyevsky District
Vladimirovka, Aznakayevsky District, Republic of Tatarstan, a village in Aznakayevsky District

Tula Oblast
As of 2010, three rural localities in Tula Oblast bear this name:
Vladimirovka, Bogoroditsky District, Tula Oblast, a village in Malevsky Rural Okrug of Bogoroditsky District
Vladimirovka, Kimovsky District, Tula Oblast, a village in Aleksandrovsky Rural Okrug of Kimovsky District
Vladimirovka, Kireyevsky District, Tula Oblast, a village in Bogucharovsky Rural Okrug of Kireyevsky District

Tuva Republic
As of 2010, one rural locality in the Tuva Republic bears this name:
Vladimirovka, Tuva Republic, a selo in Aryg-Bazhy Sumon (Rural Settlement) of Tandinsky District

Vladimir Oblast
As of 2010, one rural locality in Vladimir Oblast bears this name:
Vladimirovka, Vladimir Oblast, a village in Sobinsky District

Vologda Oblast
As of 2010, one rural locality in Vologda Oblast bears this name:
Vladimirovka, Vologda Oblast, a village in Sudsky Selsoviet of Cherepovetsky District

Voronezh Oblast
As of 2010, six rural localities in Voronezh Oblast bear this name:
Vladimirovka, Ertilsky District, Voronezh Oblast, a settlement in Pervoertilskoye Rural Settlement of Ertilsky District
Vladimirovka, Liskinsky District, Voronezh Oblast, a selo in Petropavlovskoye Rural Settlement of Liskinsky District
Vladimirovka, Novokhopyorsky District, Voronezh Oblast, a settlement in Pykhovskoye Rural Settlement of Novokhopyorsky District
Vladimirovka, Ostrogozhsky District, Voronezh Oblast, a khutor in Dalnepolubyanskoye Rural Settlement of Ostrogozhsky District
Vladimirovka, Rossoshansky District, Voronezh Oblast, a khutor in Lizinovskoye Rural Settlement of Rossoshansky District
Vladimirovka, Verkhnekhavsky District, Voronezh Oblast, a settlement in Maloprivalovskoye Rural Settlement of Verkhnekhavsky District

Renamed localities
Vladimirovka, name of Yuzhno-Sakhalinsk, Russia in 1882–1905

Abolished localities
Vladimirovka, Perevozsky District, Nizhny Novgorod Oblast, a former rural locality (a village) in Dzerzhinsky Selsoviet of Perevozsky District, Nizhny Novgorod Oblast; abolished in July 2013